C. M. Rubin is a children's book writer. She is also the author of The Real Alice in Wonderland, a biography of Alice Liddell.

Biography
C. M. Rubin was born in Georgetown, Guyana. She grew up all over the world, living in United States, Europe, Africa and the Middle East. She worked as a marketing executive with EMI films and RCA/Columbia Pictures Video in Britain.

Works 

 Let's Buy Hollywood (1992) a board game based on the entertainment industry, developed with her husband Harry M. Rubin. 
 Eleanor, Ellatony, Ellencake and Me and Ellie: The Perfect Dress for Me.
 The Real Alice in Wonderland: A Role Model for All Ages  - Written with her daughter Gabriella. Alice Liddell, inspiration for Alice in Wonderland and Through the Looking-Glass, was the aunt of one of Rubin's great-aunts.

References 

Date of birth missing (living people)
Living people
People from Georgetown, Guyana
Guyanese writers
Guyanese women writers
Children's writers
Women children's writers
Alumni of the University of Worcester
Year of birth missing (living people)